Patrick de Oliveira Vieira (born 22 January 1991), simply known as Patrick Vieira, is a Brazilian professional footballer who plays as a right or left back for Linense.

Club career
On 16 August 2015, Patrick signed a two-year contract with C.S. Marítimo in Portugal, where he would play 71 matches and one goal in two seasons. In June 2017, he signed for Portuguese champions S.L. Benfica.

On 25 November 2022, Patrick signed with Linense for the 2023 season.

References

External links
 
 

1991 births
Living people
Brazilian footballers
Association football fullbacks
América Futebol Clube (MG) players
Associação Atlética Francana players
Ipatinga Futebol Clube players
ABC Futebol Clube players
C.S. Marítimo players
S.L. Benfica footballers
Vitória F.C. players
C.D. Santa Clara players
Coritiba Foot Ball Club players
C.D. Mafra players
Clube Atlético Linense players
Campeonato Brasileiro Série A players
Campeonato Brasileiro Série B players
Campeonato Brasileiro Série C players
Primeira Liga players
Liga Portugal 2 players
Brazilian expatriate footballers
Brazilian expatriate sportspeople in Portugal
Expatriate footballers in Portugal